Penicillium halotolerans is a species of the genus of Penicillium which has the ability to tolerate 5% NaCl.

References

halotolerans
Fungi described in 2012
Halophiles